The Schleicher AS 33 is a German glider manufactured by Alexander Schleicher. The prototype had its maiden flight from Huhnrain Airport, Poppenhausen near Frankfurt on 23 January 2020. The design can be flown in the 18 metre class or in the 15 metre class.

Design and development 
The AS 33 is based upon the ASG 29, with a totally new wing with an  span and  area, which optimizes the airflow around the fuselage/wing transition as well as at the wingtips. The AS 33 is a single-seat, mid-wing sailplane of composite construction, with a T-tail. To fly in the FAI 15m class, a second pair of outer wings is available. The separation point for the outer wings is at 5.1m along the span.

The glider has upward extending three-tier air-brakes and independently switchable electrical valves for the water ballast tanks in the inner and outer wings. The main wheel has a disc brake. The main wheel and the tail-wheel are retractable.

Schleicher no longer includes the designer's initial in the glider's designation.

Variants 
AS 33:	Pure sailplane, without any engine.
AS 33Es: with SOLO 2350 engine with an electric starter
AS33Me: Electric self-launcher

Specifications (with 18m wings)

Similar aircraft
Schempp-Hirth Ventus-3
Jonker JS-3 Rapture
List of gliders

References

External links 

2020s German sailplanes
Schleicher aircraft
Motor gliders
Mid-wing aircraft
Aircraft first flown in 2020